The 2002 WNBA season was the 6th season and their last in Utah. They won their first playoff series with a 1st round victory over the Houston Comets, but lost in a sweep to the Los Angeles Sparks in the West Finals. After the season, the team relocated to San Antonio, Texas to become the San Antonio Silver Stars.

Offseason

WNBA Draft

Regular season

Season standings

Season schedule

Player stats

References

Utah Starzz seasons
Utah
Utah Starzz